The Brandon School Division is a school division in Brandon, Manitoba.  It is overseen by a board of nine trustees.

Elementary schools are: Alexander School (Alexander), Betty Gibson School, Earl Oxford School, 
George Fitton School, Green Acres School, Harrison Middle School,  J. R. Reid School, King George School, Kirkcaldy Heights School, Linden Lanes School, Maryland Park School, Meadows School, École New Era School, École O'Kelly School (CFB Shilo), Riverheights School, Riverview School, St. Augustine School, Valleyview School, and Waverly Park School.

Secondary schools are: Crocus Plains Regional Secondary School, École Neelin High School, and Vincent Massey High School.

See also
 List of school districts in Manitoba

External links
Brandon School Division home page

School districts in Manitoba
Education in Brandon, Manitoba